Jutta Koether (born 1958) is a German artist, musician and critic based in New York City and Berlin since the early 1990s.

Early life and education
Koether was born in Cologne and studied art and philosophy at the University of Cologne. She relocated to New York City in 1991.

Career 
Koether's paintings are exercises in color, line, form and pattern and often feature text. Her style has precedent in the work of Sigmar Polke and Kenny Scharf. She is also inspired by artists and intellectuals who have created an alternative to mainstream culture, including underground filmmaker Kenneth Anger and musician Patti Smith. She has collaborated with Sonic Youth’s Kim Gordon on a number of projects, for example Her Noise at Tate Modern in 2005. Koether's work is also affiliated with Martin Kippenberger. Their relationship began in Cologne when she interviewed him for Spex magazine. Although her work is not as grandiose as Kippenberger, both their works engage with the dense history of European, and more specifically, German painting.

For much of the 1990s, she mixed graffiti-inspired brushwork, fluorescent colors (especially bright pink), fragmented images and assorted quotations on surfaces that had a vibrant, all-over undergrowth. Her solo show at Pat Hearn Gallery, New York, in 1997 featured a soundtrack by the artist, accompanied by Tom Verlaine.  Her visionary work, according to The New York Times art critic Roberta Smith, sees painting as multipurpose.

Koether’s 2009 show entitled Lux Exterior at Reena Spaulings further explored a common thematic in her work, the relation of painting with other aspects of theoretical and counter culture. Koether’s 2009 show was discussed in David Joselit’s essay entitled Painting Beside Itself. The exhibition, which included a painting entitled Hot Rod (after Poussin) (2009) along with sculptural found objects and a series of three performances, was noted by Joselit as a “sophisticated response to the question which I began [this essay]: How does a painting belong to a network?”

In spring 2012, Koether took part in the three-month exposition of  Whitney Biennial.  Around that time, she conceived two large series of works that respond directly to the French artist Nicolas Poussin, a reinterpretation of his The Seven Sacraments reimagined as a series of installations, and Seasons (2012), a response to Poussin’s The Four Seasons.

Since 1985, Koether has also worked as a reviewer and editor for many magazines and journals such as Spex, Texte zur Kunst, Flash Art and Artscribe.

Koether has taught at many institutions, including Columbia University, the Academy of Fine Arts in Berlin, Yale University, and Bard College. Currently, she is a professor at the Hochschule für bildende Künste Hamburg.

Selected exhibitions

2014	
 Maquis, Galerie Francesca Pia, Zürich
 A Moveable Feast - Part XV, Campoli Presti, Paris
 Champrovement, Reena Spaulings, New York

2013
 Un établissement aux Folies-Koethère, Établissement d'en face projects, Brussels 
 Cycle 1. Jutta Koether. Viktoria, Luise, Isabelle, Praxes, Berlin
 The Double Session, Campoli Presti, London
 Seasons and Sacraments, Arnolfini, Bristol, United Kingdom
 Seasons and Sacraments, Dundee Contemporary Arts, Dundee, United Kingdom

2012
 The Fifth Season, Bortolami Gallery, New York

2011
 Mad Garland, Campoli Presti, Paris
 The Thirst, Moderna Museet, Stockholm
 Berliner Schlussel, Galerie Daniel Buchholz, Berlin

2009
  Van Abbemuseum, Eindhoven
 Lux Interior, Reena Spaulings Fine Art, New York
 Sovereign Women in Painting, Susanne Vielmetter Los Angeles Projects, Los Angeles

2008
 New Yorker Fenster, Galerie Daniel Buchholz, Köln
  No.5, Kunsthall Landmark, Bergen
 JXXXA LEIBHAFTIGE MALEREI, Sutton Lane, Paris
 Touch and Resist, Song Song, Wien
   Galerie Francesca Pia, Zürich

2007
 Anderungen aller Art, Kunsthalle Bern, Bern

2006
 Love In a Void, Akademie der Bildenden Künste, Vienna
 Metalist Moment, Performance, Herald St, London

2005
 Very Lost Highway, Simultanhalle, Köln
 extreme harsh, Ausstellungsraum Ursula Werz, Tübingen
 I Is Had Gone, Thomas Erben Gallery, New York
 Her Noise, South London Gallery, London
 Blankness is not a Void, Standard Oslo, Oslo
 Kim Gordon and Jutta Koether, Talk and Performance at Tate Modern, London

2004
 Curious Crystals of Unusual Purity, P.S.1 Institute for Contemporary Art, New York City
 Fresh Aufhebung - Künstlerisches Interesse am philosophische verneinten Wunderglauben, Kölnischer Kunstverein, Köln
   Galerie Meerrettich, Berlin
 Fresh Aufhebung, 271 Grand Street, New York

2003
 Desire Is War, Galerie Meerrettich, Berlin
 The Club in the Shadow, in collaboration with Kim Gordon, Kenny Schachter conTEMPorary, New York

2002
 Black Bonds, Jutta Koether and Steven Parrino, Swiss Institute, New York
   Galerie Daniel Buchholz, Köln

2000
   Galerie Daniel Buchholz, Köln
 zur grünen schenke-fünf uhr nachmittags. die geheimen Bilder, Galerie Freund, Wien

1999

1998

Brushholder Value, Westfälischer Kunstverein, Münster

1994

Dysfunction USA, Arthur Rogers Gallery, New Orleans

1993

Parralax View: Cologne-New York, P.S. 1 Institute for Contemporary Art, New York

1987

Werkschau Jutta Koether, Kunstraum Stuttgart, Stuttgart

References

External links
Jutta Koether on ArtFacts.Net
Images, biography and texts from the Saatchi Gallery
 Susanne Vielmetter Los Angeles Projects; Jutta Koether Biographie, Pressemitteilungen und Arbeiten General information on Jutta Koether
Martin Pesch: Jutta Koether at Galerie Daniel Bucholz (Review)
Jutta Koether at Campoli Presti

Living people
1958 births
Artists from Cologne
Women in electronic music
German contemporary artists
University of Cologne alumni
Academic staff of the University of Fine Arts of Hamburg